Aridibacter famidurans is a non-motile bacterium from the genus of Aridibacter which has been isolated from clayey sand from Erichsfelde in Namibia.

References 

Acidobacteriota
Bacteria described in 2014